Brightlight Productions is a Philippine television production company founded and owned by Albee Benitez who previously served as Negros Occidental's 3rd district representative from 2010 to 2019 and the current Mayor of Bacolod.

Airing more than 18 hours of airtime every week, it currently serves as one of the blocktime partners and distributor of Cignal Entertainment for TV5 and ABS-CBN Corporation for Kapamilya Channel, A2Z (blocktime with ZOE Broadcasting Network), Kapamilya Online Live, ABS-CBN's international channel The Filipino Channel, and streaming platform iWantTFC  (blocktime for Rated Korina and airing rights for Sunday 'Kada, Oh My Dad!, and I Got You) and has signed up stars and talents from ABS-CBN and GMA Network.

History 
Following the non-renewal of ABS-CBN's franchise after its expiration on May 4, 2020, and its denial on July 10, 2020, TV5, secured timeslots from several other blocktimers featuring artists from the aforementioned network. On September 14, 2020, it was reported that several ABS-CBN artists would have shows on TV5 as the company signed a blocktime agreement with TV5.

On October 18, 2020, Brightlight Productions launched their first wave of shows, namely, Sunday Noontime Live!, I Got You and Sunday 'Kada which aired on back-to-back Sunday afternoon timeslots. In the following days, the other shows premiered.

On January 17, 2021, it was reported that after three months, their Sunday programs would air their final episodes due to lack of advertisers and sponsorships. This resulted in the loss of their budget to pay the blocktime agreement with TV5.

Following the end of their Sunday programs, ABS-CBN-produced programs ASAP and the FPJ: Da King movie block took over their respective timeslots on TV5.

As of May 2021, the production company currently produces Lunch Out Loud and Rated Korina. Their Sunday afternoon shows ended on January 17, 2021, while Oh My Dad! ended on April 24, 2021.

Some of their shows (like Rated Korina and Sunday 'Kada) are currently airing on programming affiliate ABS-CBN's iWantTFC and worldwide via The Filipino Channel.

Artists 

Artists currently under Brightlight Productions are as follows:
 Korina Sanchez-Roxas
 Billy Crawford
 Alex Gonzaga
 Bayani Agbayani
 K Brosas
 KC Montero
 Ariel Rivera
 Ariel Ureta
 Wacky Kiray
 Gloria Diaz
 Louise Abuel
 Miggs Cuaderno
 Elijah Alejo
 Princess Aguilar
 Josh Eugenio
 Sandy Daza
 Vic Sotto
 Pauleen Luna
 Matteo Guidicelli

Former artists 
 Piolo Pascual
 Catriona Gray
 Maja Salvador
 Donny Pangilinan
 Jake Ejercito
 Ricci Rivero
 Beauty Gonzalez
 Jane Oineza
 RK Bagatsing
 Ritz Azul
 Miles Ocampo
 Daniel Matsunaga
 Edgar Mortiz
 Jayson Gainza
 Ian Veneracion
 Sue Ramirez
 Dimples Romana
 Robi Domingo
 Regine Velasquez
 Gary Valenciano
 Moira Dela Torre
 Chito Miranda

Filmography

Television

Film

References

External links 
 
 
 

Television production companies of the Philippines
Mass media companies established in 2020
2020 establishments in the Philippines